Oakville is an unincorporated community in Monroe Township, Delaware County, Indiana.

Geography

History
Oakville was originally called Pleasant Hill, and under the latter name was established in 1873. The Oakville post office opened in 1876.

On April 1, 1884, an F5 tornado destroyed most of Oakville, killing eight people.

References

Unincorporated communities in Delaware County, Indiana
Unincorporated communities in Indiana